Seduction is an American female dance-pop, house and freestyle trio from New York assembled and produced by Robert Clivillés and David Cole (later of C+C Music Factory), originally consisting of members April Harris, Michelle Visage, and Idalis DeLeón.

History
Intended as a studio project, and prior to any assemblage of the aforementioned trio, the first track produced, "Seduction" (later renamed "Seduction's Theme" on their album), featured vocals by Carol Cooper, and was released to dance clubs and became a top 20 hit on the dance charts. The second single, "(You're My One and Only) True Love" featured uncredited vocals by Martha Wash. Against its producers' expectations, it ended up becoming a hit. Envisioning a potential hit phenomenon, Cole and Clivillés set to the task of assembling a group of women who displayed talent, sex appeal, and multi-format potential. Visage, DeLeon and Harris were assembled as a group to promote the single.

The group quickly recorded the album Nothing Matters Without Love and subsequent singles. Their biggest hit came in early 1990 with "Two to Make It Right" (featuring April and Michelle on Lead Vocals), a No. 2 pop hit. The hit music video was created and produced by the production team of Director Stu Sleppin and Producer Bob Teeman. In mid–1990, DeLeon left the group and was replaced by Sinoa Loren (born December 6, 1966). After a pair of hits with this lineup, the group disbanded in 1991. Harris owns the rights to the name Seduction and reassembled the group with two new members, Maria Flora and Eunice Foster, and released an album of new material, Feel Brand New, through AVH Entertainment (her own label) under the name Seduction in 2005.

Discography

Studio albums

Remix albums

Singles

Notes

References

External links

American dance girl groups
Musical groups established in 1989
American house music groups
American freestyle music groups
American dance music groups
Musical groups from New York City